DMTMM (4-(4,6-dimethoxy-1,3,5-triazin-2-yl)-4-methyl-morpholinium chloride) is an organic triazine derivative commonly used for activation of carboxylic acids, particularly for amide synthesis. Amide coupling is one of the most common reactions in organic chemistry and DMTMM is one reagent used for that reaction. The mechanism of DMTMM coupling is similar to other common amide coupling reactions involving activated carboxylic acids. Its precursor, 2-chloro-4,6,-dimethoxy-1,3,5-triazine (CDMT), has also been used for amide coupling. DMTMM has also been used to synthesize other carboxylic functional groups such as esters and anhydrides. DMTMM is usually used in the chloride form but the tetrafluoroborate salt is also commercially available.

Synthesis 
DMTMM is prepared by reaction of 2-chloro-4,6-dimethoxy-1,3,5-triazine (CDMT) with N-methylmorpholine (NMM). It was first reported in 1999. CDMT spontaneously reacts with NMM to form the quaternary ammonium chloride salt of DMTMM.

Reactions

Amides 
Amides can be readily prepared from the corresponding carboxylic acid and amine using DMTMM coupling. DMTMM has been shown to be preferable to other coupling agents in several cases, such as for sterically hindered amines and for ligation of polysaccharides such as hyaluronic acid.

Other carboxylic derivatives 
Despite primarily being used for amide synthesis, DMTMM can also be used to make esters from the corresponding alcohol and carboxylic acid. DMTMM has also been applied to anhydride synthesis. The synthesis of each carboxylic derivative is similar, relying on the activation of the starting carboxylic acid followed by nucleophilic attack by another molecule.

Coupling mechanism 
DMTMM uses a typical mechanism to form carboxylic acid derivatives. First, the carboxylic acid reacts with DMTMM to form the active ester, releasing a molecule of N-methylmorpholinium (NMM). The resulting ester is highly reactive and can undergo a nucleophilic attack by an amine, an alcohol, or another nucleophile. A molecule of 4,6,-dimethoxy-1,3,5-triazin-2-ol is released and the corresponding carboxylic derivative is formed.

Safety 
DMTMM can cause damage to the skin and eyes and may be toxic if ingested. Protective gloves, lab coats, and eye protection should be employed to reduce exposure while using DMTMM. DMTMM should be stored at -20 °C and kept dry.

References 

Morpholines
Triazines
Peptide coupling reagents
Chlorides